Fake Surfers is an album by Seattle lo-fi post-punk band the Intelligence, released on In the Red Records in 2009.

Track listing

Guests
Monty Buckles (of The Lamps) - vocals and synth on #4, guitar on #6
Brian Carver (of Christmas Island) - vocals on #2, #6, and #11
Brad Eberhard (of Wounded Lion) - vocals on #3, #6, and #11

References

2009 albums
The Intelligence albums
In the Red Records albums